Omaha Bryan High School is a public high school located in Bellevue, Nebraska, United States. It is a part of Omaha Public Schools.

History
The current building for William Jennings Bryan Senior High School was completed in 1971.  The school was named after the Nebraska politician.  Bryan's history, however, extends back to 1965 when the first students entered what is now the Bryan Middle School building.  That building had been designed as a junior-senior high complex.  It was from there that the first Bryan senior class graduated in 1968.

Omaha Public School District built the Bryan Senior High as part of the school complex to meet increasing enrollments.

Bryan High's current enrollment averages 1,700 students; there are approximately 90 faculty members.

25th anniversary and other changes
In 1993, the school celebrated its 25th anniversary with a time capsule for future students. The capsule was slated to be opened in 2018; The capsule was finally opened in 2022.

From 2000 to about 2005, Bryan went through some new renovations and additions.  In 2004, the school had a new section built, along the south side, which houses four new classrooms.  Four cottages (portables) are outside the NW of the building.  In 2001, six more cottages were added to the NE side of the building.  At that time a weight room was added to the upper gym, through the efforts of Dave and Carol Van Metre.  Currently the other side is used as a practice area by the wrestling team.  In 2004 two additional cottages were added on the west side of the building.

As of about 2001, Bryan High became a member of the AOF (Academy of Finance).

The school was on a normal class schedule before the fall of 1994, with classes being year-long. Block scheduling (4 x 4) was then created, with a 13-minute "Advisement" at the start of the school day.  Students attend four blocks and Advisement, per day. Four lunches run during 3rd block to accommodate student population. Each block is 90 minutes long. In August 2012, the schedule was changed to a Block schedule with A & B (alternative day) classes.

In 2007 Bryan High School added new trees along the front of the building and stones to sit on. The library also went through changes; a section was transformed into rooms for assistant principals, and its entryway was extended into double doors.

Athletics

State championships

Notable alumni
Ken Clark, former NFL running back and 8th round pick in the 1990 NFL Draft
SA Martinez, Douglas Vincent Martinez, vocalist and DJ in the band 311
P-Nut, Aaron Charles Wills, bass guitarist in the band 311
Lindsay Wagner, Playboy Playmate, November 2007
Terence Crawford, professional boxer
Jason Parker, National Rifle Team Head Coach, former 4 time Olympian, earned 2 World Championships, medalist in five Pan Am games, nine World Cups (7 gold)
Lieutenant General (retired) David R. Hogg, former U.S. military representative to the NATO Military Committee and Commanding General, U.S. Army Africa, awarded Defense Distinguished Service Medal.
Christopher M Dukes, actor
Jonathan (JB) Brown, location manager and producer.  Location manager for Punk'd, The Biggest Loser, America's Top Model, and Masterchef.
Steve Pivovar, 45-year veteran sports journalist for Omaha World Herald.

References

External links
 Bryan High School

Buildings and structures in Bellevue, Nebraska
Educational institutions established in 1971
High schools in Omaha, Nebraska
Omaha Public Schools
Schools in Sarpy County, Nebraska
Public high schools in Nebraska